The Spark is the fifth studio album by English rock band Enter Shikari, released on 22 September 2017 through Ambush Reality and PIAS Recordings. It was recorded in Northamptonshire in early 2017.

Background and production
Following world events in 2016, including Brexit and the election of Donald Trump, leadman Rou Reynolds announced on Twitter that he had been suffering from general anxiety disorder. He declared his frustration and newfound inspiration to write what he intended to be the band's most important work.

Recording for The Spark took place at Angelio Studios and Muttley Ranch in England with David Kosten and Reynolds acting as producers. Sessions were recorded by Kosten and Tim Morris. Additional recording was done by Reynolds at Radiate Studios with assistance from Luke Gibbs. Koston provided additional keyboards and programming to the tracks. In addition, Will Harvey and Augusta Harris contributed violin  and cello, respectively. Koston mixed the album, which was mastered for CD and digital download by Bob Ludwig at Gateway Mastering and for vinyl by Stuart Hawken at Metropolis.

Release
On 31 July 2017, the band released a music video for the first single "Live Outside". On 13 September 2017, the second single and the music video for "Rabble Rouser" was released. The album was released on 22 September 2017 through Ambush Reality and PIAS Recordings. In November and December 2017, the band will support the release of the album with an arena tour of the UK and mainland Europe.

Critical reception

The Spark was met with positive reviews from critics. Metacritic gave the album an aggregated score of 74/100, indicating "generally favorable reviews", based on 10 reviews.

Francesca Gosling writing for The Irish Times gave The Spark a positive score of 8/10, summarising that "Those hoping for a return to the earlier sound may be disappointed, but Enter Shikari's unflinching desire to evolve with every release is something very exciting indeed."

The Spark won the Best Album award at the 2018 Kerrang! Awards.

Track listing
All lyrics by Rou Reynolds. All music by Enter Shikari.

Personnel
Personnel per booklet.

Enter Shikari
 Rou Reynolds – lead vocals, keyboards, programming, piano, guitar, trumpet
 Rory Clewlow – lead guitar, vocals, mbira
 Chris Batten – bass, vocals, organ
 Rob Rolfe – drums, percussion

Additional musicians
 David Kosten – additional keyboards, programming
 Will Harvey – violin
 Augusta Harris – cello
 Julz Baldwin, Eman Kwenortey, Nathan Killham, Jamie Whymark, Alex Cribbs, Jack Goodwin, Lee Jeffrey, Matt Pondell, Arun Chamba, William Tallis, Matt Knowles, Daniel Griffin, Nathan Harlow, Adam Holdsworth, Zac Houili, George Rockett, Ben Gibson, Patrick O'Hanlon, Clementyne Lavender, Danny Price, Jonathan Kogan, Leo Taylor, Hollie Robinson, Zoe London, Lee Burgess, Ian Drayner, James Power, Corinne Cumming, Fraser Woodhouse, Pip Newby – gang vocals

Production
 David Kosten – producer, mixing, recording
 Rou Reynolds – producer, additional recording, art direction
 Tim Morris – recording
 Luke Gibbs – studio assistant
 Bob Ludwig – mastering (CD/digital)
 Stuart Hawkes – mastering (vinyl)
 Richard Littler – design, layout, photo edits
 Ian Johnsen – art direction
 Pip Newby - A&R
 Jennifer McCord – band photo
 Modo – artwork ("machine")
 Agata Wolanska – object photos

Charts

References

2017 albums
Ambush Reality albums
Enter Shikari albums
PIAS Recordings albums